Ivan Nesterenko (born 23 July 2003) is a Ukrainian professional footballer who plays as a midfielder for FC Vorskla Poltava in the Ukrainian Premier League.

Career
Nesterenko is a product of Metalurh Zaporizhzhia and Shakhtar Donetsk systems. 

In January 2021 he was signed by Vorskla Poltava. He made his debut as a second half-time substituted player for Vorskla Poltava in the Ukrainian Premier League in an away losing match against FC Kolos Kovalivka on 24 April 2021.

International career
In March 2021, Nesterenko was called up to the preliminary squad of the Ukraine national under-18 football team, with which he was expected to participated in the training preparation to qualifying matches for the youth Euro 2022, but later the training was canceled due to the coronavirus pandemic.

References

External links
 

2003 births
Living people
Footballers from Zaporizhzhia
Ukrainian footballers
FC Metalurh-2 Zaporizhzhia players
FC Vorskla Poltava players
Ukrainian Premier League players

Association football midfielders